The 2018–19 Southeastern Louisiana Lady Lions basketball team represented Southeastern Louisiana University during the 2018–19 NCAA Division I women's basketball season. The Lady Lions were led by second year head coach Ayla Guzzardo, and played their home games at the University Center as members of the Southland Conference. They finished the season 9–20, 4–14 in Southland play to finish in a tie for last place. They failed to qualify for the Southland women's tournament.

Previous season
The Lady Lions finished the 2017–18 season with an 8–21 overall record and a 7–11 record in Southland play to finish in ninth place. They failed to qualify for the Southland women's tournament.

Roster
Sources:

Schedule
Source

|-
!colspan=9 style=| Non-conference regular season

|-
!colspan=9 style=| Southland Conference regular season

See also
 2018–19 Southeastern Louisiana Lions basketball team

References

Southeastern Louisiana Lady Lions basketball seasons
Southeastern Louisiana
Southeastern Louisiana
Southeastern Louisiana